Savage Souls is the fourth studio album by the German power metal band Mystic Prophecy.

Behind track #11 there's after 9:13 minutes of silence a hidden / secret spoken outro for about 30 seconds.  A limited edition digibook version of the album was released including a DVD of the band performing most of the tracks live for an audience of their biggest fans.

Track listing
 "Shadow Beyond My Soul" (Liapakis / Pohl) - 4:18
 "Master of Sins" (Liapakis / Grimm) - 4:30
 "Evil Empires" (Liapakis / Albrecht) - 4:16
 "Savage Souls" (Liapakis / Albrecht) - 4:30
 "In the Darkness" (Liapakis / Albrecht) - 5:10
 "Deception of Hate" (Liapakis / Pohl / Grimm) - 3:56
 "Sins and Sorrows" (Liapakis / Pohl / Grimm) - 4:26
 "Best Days of My Life" (Liapakis / Albrecht / Grimm) - 4:30
 "Nightmares of Demons" (Liapakis / Pohl) - 4:08
 "Victim of Fate" (Liapakis / Grimm) - 4:34
 "Into the Fire" (Liapakis / Albrecht) - 15:14

Credits
 Roberto Dimitri Liapakis   -  vocals
 Martin Grimm   -  guitars
 Markus Pohl    -  guitars
 Martin Albrecht - Bass
 Mattias Straub  - drums

2004 albums
Mystic Prophecy albums
Massacre Records albums